The Sajó (Hungarian) or Slaná (Slovak) is a river in Slovakia and Hungary.

Its length is 229 km, of which 110 km is in Slovakia. Its source is in the Stolica Mountains range of the Slovak Ore Mountains.  It flows through the Slovak town Rožňava and the Hungarian city Miskolc. In Hungary it flows through the county of Borsod-Abaúj-Zemplén. It flows into the River Tisza near Tiszaújváros. Its main tributaries are the Bodva and the Hornád.

Also known for Battle of the Sajó River from 11 April 1241 between the Mongol Empire and the Kingdom of Hungary.

Etymology
The origin of the name is the subject of scholar discussions. Hungarian linguists and historians suggested the derivation from the Hungarian sojó, só folyó (salt water, river) already in the 19th century. Newer theories associate the name with sió referring to fast streams. According to Slovak linguists the name is pre-Hungarian (Slaná: salt river) and most likely not associated with the salinity but with the salt road existing already in times of Great Moravia.  The supporters argue by numerous Slavic toponyms in the river basin and by local names related to soľ (salt) and Moravia like  Moravce, Soľár, Solišče, Soľka, Soľník, Morava (according to this interpretation the Hungarian name is a later translation).

References

 
Rivers of Hungary
Rivers of Slovakia
International rivers of Europe